Reedsburg is a town in Sauk County, Wisconsin, United States. The population was 1,236 at the 2000 census. The City of Reedsburg is located within the town, though it is politically independent.

Geography
According to the United States Census Bureau, the town has a total area of 30.8 square miles (79.7 km2), of which, 30.8 square miles (79.6 km2) of it is land and 0.03% is water.

Demographics
As of the census of 2000, there were 1,236 people, 394 households, and 334 families residing in the town.  The population density was 40.2 people per square mile (15.5/km2).  There were 415 housing units at an average density of 13.5 per square mile (5.2/km2).  The racial makeup of the town was 99.43% White, 0.32% Native American, 0.16% Asian, and 0.08% from two or more races.  0.40% of the population were Hispanic or Latino of any race.

There were 394 households, out of which 33.5% had children under the age of 18 living with them, 77.2% were married couples living together, 4.3% had a female householder with no husband present, and 15.2% were non-families. 11.7% of all households were made up of individuals, and 5.3% had someone living alone who was 65 years of age or older.  The average household size was 2.78 and the average family size was 3.01.

In the town, the population was spread out, with 22.9% under the age of 18, 5.8% from 18 to 24, 23.9% from 25 to 44, 25.9% from 45 to 64, and 21.4% who were 65 years of age or older.  The median age was 43 years. For every 100 females, there were 96.5 males.  For every 100 females age 18 and over, there were 97.3 males.

The median income for a household in the town was $49,236, and the median income for a family was $50,455. Males had a median income of $33,304 versus $22,177 for females. The per capita income for the town was $19,658.  About 4.1% of families and 6.1% of the population were below the poverty line, including 8.6% of those under age 18 and 5.9% of those age 65 or over.

References

Towns in Sauk County, Wisconsin
Towns in Wisconsin